Hoya lanceolata is a species of flowering plant in the family Apocynaceae. It is native to the Himalayas, Nepal, Assam, Bangladesh, Myanmar, south-central China, and Vietnam. Its subspecies, Hoya lanceolata subsp.bella, the beautiful wax plant, has gained the Royal Horticultural Society's Award of Garden Merit, but some authorities recognize it as its own species, Hoya bella.

References

lanceolata
Flora of East Himalaya
Flora of West Himalaya
Flora of Nepal
Flora of Assam (region)
Flora of Bangladesh
Flora of Myanmar
Flora of South-Central China
Flora of Vietnam
Plants described in 1825